The 2016–17 season of the Hoofdklasse is played in 7 groups in 6 different districts (North, East, West 1, West 2, South 1 and South 2).

Hoofdklasse North

Hoofdklasse East

Hoofdklasse West I - Group 1

Hoofdklasse West I - Group 2

Hoofdklasse West II

Hoofdklasse South I

Hoofdklasse South II

References

Futsal competitions in the Netherlands